Sommerer House is a historic home located at South Bend, St. Joseph County, Indiana. It was built about 1875, and consists of a two-story, rectangular main block with a one-story wing and two-story ell. It is representative of the Upright and Wing vernacular wood-frame house type. It is sheathed in clapboard siding and gable and shed roofs. The house features two ornately decorated porches.

It was listed on the National Register of Historic Places in 1999.

References

Houses on the National Register of Historic Places in Indiana
Houses completed in 1875
Buildings and structures in South Bend, Indiana
Houses in St. Joseph County, Indiana
National Register of Historic Places in St. Joseph County, Indiana